

The following is a list of notable earthquakes that have affected the British Isles. On average, several hundred earthquakes are detected by the British Geological Survey each year, but almost all are far too faint to be felt by humans. Those that are felt generally cause very little damage. Nonetheless, earthquakes have on occasion resulted in considerable damage, most notably in 1580 and 1884; Musson (2003) reports that there have been ten documented fatalities – six caused by falling masonry and four by building collapse. The causes of earthquakes in the UK are unclear, but may include "regional compression caused by motion of the Earth’s tectonic plates, and uplift resulting from the melting of the ice sheets that covered many parts of Britain thousands of years ago." Medieval reports of "earthquakes" that threw down newly built cathedrals may simply have been catastrophic failure of overloaded masonry, particularly towers, rather than actual tectonic events.

Earthquakes

See also
Geology of England
Geology of Great Britain
List of volcanoes in the United Kingdom

References

Citations

Bibliography

 BGS Historical earthquakes listing
 BGS Interactive UK earthquakes map
 Archives of the British Geological Survey
 R M W Musson, "Fatalities in British earthquakes". Astronomy & Geophysics. Vol. 44, p1 (2003)

External links 
 Historical UK earthquakes – BGS
 List of Earthquakes in the British Isles
 Q&A: UK's small-scale earthquakes

 Earthquakes in the United Kingdom
United Kingdom
Earthquakes
Earthquakes
earthquakes
earthquakes